South Korea participated as Korea in the ninth Winter Paralympics in Turin, Italy. 

Korea entered three athletes in the following sports:

Alpine skiing: 3 male

Medalists

See also
2006 Winter Paralympics
South Korea at the 2006 Winter Olympics

External links
Torino 2006 Paralympic Games
International Paralympic Committee

2006
Nations at the 2006 Winter Paralympics
Winter Paralympics